Electron Kebebew, M.D., is an American surgeon, educator, and scientist. Kebebew is currently the Harry A. Oberhelman Jr. and Mark L. Welton Professor and Chief of General Surgery at Stanford University. Kebebew is internationally known for his clinical and research expertise in endocrine surgery and oncology.

Early life and education 
Electron Kebebew was born in Addis Ababa, Ethiopia on February 26, 1968. His mother's first language is Amharic. In 1978, as a young boy, he immigrated to Los Angeles, California due to the violent revolution in Ethiopia. Kebebew graduated from the University of California, Los Angeles in 1991 with a B.S. in Chemical Engineering. After graduating and working in chemical engineering, Kebebew decided to study medicine. In 1995, he graduated with a medicine degree from the University of California, San Francisco where he also went on to do his General Surgery residency and postdoctoral fellowship in cancer research.

Career

Career at University of California, San Francisco 
From 1995–2002, Kebebew was an intern, resident, research fellow, and, eventually, Chief Resident at the University of California, San Francisco (UCSF). He received a T32 NIH Surgical Oncology Fellowship during 1997–1999 and worked in the Endocrine Oncology laboratory of Drs. Orlo H. Clark and Quan-Yang Duh. After finishing his training, in 2002, Kebebew became Assistant Professor of Surgery at UCSF. He established his research and continued to operate on hundreds of patients with endocrine tumors each year at the Endocrine Surgery and Oncology Clinic at the UCSF Diller Comprehensive Cancer Center.

Career at the National Cancer Institute, National Institutes of Health 
In 2009, Kebebew became one of the handful of African American tenured Senior Investigators at the National Institutes of Health (NIH) within the National Cancer Institute (NCI). Under the leadership of Harold E. Varmus, Kebebew became the inaugural Chief of Endocrine Oncology Surgery Branch overseeing $10 million in research each year. During his time at the NIH, Kebebew treated complicated cancer cases in thousands of patients from all over the world. The Endocrine Oncology Surgery Branch became an international model for educating surgeons to become researchers. His research laboratory at the NIH published hundreds of journal articles and producing dozens of scientists through the surgeon research training fellowship program.

Career at Stanford University 
In 2018, Kebebew became the Chief of General Surgery and the Harry A. Oberhelman, Jr. and Mark L. Welton Professor of Surgery at Stanford University. He oversees the entire General Surgery Division which includes colorectal surgery, minimally invasive and bariatric surgery, trauma/critical care and acute care surgery and surgical oncology (breast, gastrointestinal, hepatopancreaticobiliary and endocrine surgery), and general surgery at the Veterans Affairs Palo Alto Health Care System. His research laboratory includes research fellows studying endocrine tumors.

Scientific Research 
Kebebew focuses on translational and clinical investigations involving tumors from the endocrine system. As of 2020, he has published over 400 scientific articles, as well as textbooks and chapters, opinion pieces, reviews and newsletter articles. His focus is on developing effective therapies for fatal, rare and neglected endocrine cancers and to identify new methods, strategies and technologies for improving the diagnosis and treatment of endocrine neoplasms and the prognosis of endocrine cancers, and to develop methods for precision treatment of endocrine tumors. His published works can be found on PubMed.gov.

Thyroid Journal 
In 2020, Kebebew became the Editor-in-Chief of the scientific journal Thyroid and has served on the editorial board and as a reviewer for 54 biomedical journals.

Organizations 
Kebebew is a fellow of the American College of Surgeons, a member of the American Thyroid Association, American Association of Endocrine Surgeons, and the Society of Black Academic Surgeons. Kebebew is the Goodwill Ambassador for the nonprofit Ethiopia Reads which promotes children’s literacy.

Awards 
Kebebew has received awards for his work, from the American Cancer Society, American Association for Cancer Research, American Association of Endocrine Surgeons, International Association of Endocrine Surgeons and the American Thyroid Association’s Van Meter Award.

References 

American surgeons
1968 births
Living people